HMS Hargood has been the name of more than one ship of the British Royal Navy, and may refer to:

 , a frigate in commission from 1943 to 1946 briefly named Hargood while under construction in 1943
 , a frigate in commission from 1944 to 1946

Royal Navy ship names